Grand Casino may refer to:

Grand Casinos, a defunct casino company
Grand Casino Biloxi, Mississippi
Grand Casino Gulfport, Mississippi
Grand Casino Tunica, Mississippi
Grand Casino Mille Lacs, Minnesota
Grand Casino Hinckley, Minnesota
Grand Casino Hotel Resort, Shawnee, Oklahoma